Kovačeviči are a brotherhood in Grahovo, Nikšić, from the Grahovo Tribe. The Kovačevići hail from several villages in Grahovo. They are by far the largest brotherhood of Grahovo.

Origin 
The Kovačevići are the largest brotherhood in Grahovo. The Progenitor of the Kovačevići brotherhood is Jovan Kovačević, they came from Jajce, Bosnia in the 1500-1600s and settled in Zaslap, and the Grahovo field. In 1709, a group of the brotherhood moved to Nevesinje.

History 
Some of the brotherhood moved to Nevesinje, Gacka, Stolac, Mostar, Zhupanje, and Lijevna. In Grahovo there were 9 brothers which settled, they built the Saint George Archangel Church. Today there are several hundreds of houses in Montenegro with origins from this brotherhood.

Notable People 

 Nikola Kovačević
 Sava Kovačević
 Drago Obrenov Kovačević
 Miloš Kovačević
 Vasilije Kovačević Čile
 Veljko Kovačević
 Vojo Kovačević
 Mirko Kovačević
 Mitar Kovačević

References

Notes

Books 

Organizations based in Bosnia and Herzegovina